Honey Grove is an unincorporated community in Tuscarora Township, Juniata County, Pennsylvania, United States. Honey Grove has a post office with ZIP code 17035, which opened on August 16, 1842.

References

Unincorporated communities in Juniata County, Pennsylvania
Unincorporated communities in Pennsylvania